The 2019 LBA Finals was the championship series of the 2018–19 regular season, of the Lega Basket Serie A (LBA), known for sponsorship reasons as the Serie A PosteMobile, the highest professional basketball league in Italy, and the conclusion of the season's playoffs. The third placed Umana Reyer Venezia possessed home advantage (with the first two, the fifth and the seventh games at the Palasport Taliercio) and the 4th placed Banco di Sardegna Sassari contested for the title in a best-of-7 showdown, from June 10 to June 22, 2019.

These were the second Finals for both Venezia and Sassari of their history.

Umana Reyer Venezia won their 4th title by beating Banco di Sardegna Sassari in game 7 of the finals.

Austin Daye of the Umana Reyer Venezia was named MVP in the league's Finals series of the playoffs.

Road to the finals

Italian Basketball Cup

Regular season series

Series

Game 1

Game 2

Game 3

Game 4

Game 5

Game 6

Game 7

Rosters

Umana Reyer Venezia

Banco di Sardegna Sassari

References

External links
Official website

Finals
Finals
Lega Basket Serie A Finals